Rodolfo Humberto Torres is an Argentinian American mathematician specializing in harmonic analysis who works as the Vice Chancellor for Research and Economic Development and a Distinguished Professor of Mathematics at the University of California, Riverside.

Torres did his undergraduate studies at the National University of Rosario in Argentina, completing a licenciatura there in 1984. He earned his doctorate in 1989 from Washington University in St. Louis, with a dissertation entitled On the Boundedness of Certain Operators with Singular Kernels on Distribution Spaces and supervised by Björn D. Jawerth.
In 2012 he became one of the inaugural fellows of the American Mathematical Society. He was named a Distinguished Professor in 2016.

As well as his work in pure mathematics, Torres has also published works on light scattering mechanisms for the colorings of birds and insects.

References

External links
Home page

1960 births
Living people
Argentine mathematicians
20th-century American mathematicians
21st-century American mathematicians
Washington University in St. Louis alumni
Washington University in St. Louis mathematicians
University of Kansas faculty
Fellows of the American Mathematical Society
National University of Rosario alumni